Gonzalo Ignacio Novoa Contreras (born 14 May 1986) is a Chilean footballer who plays as a defensive midfielder. His last club was Deportes Temuco.

Club career
A product of Universidad de Chile's youth system, Novoa was promoted to the first-adult team in 2005 by Héctor Pinto to play the Torneo Apertura. He was part of the players generation of Marcelo Díaz, Sebastián Pinto, Eric Pino, among others.

After completing loan spells in Deportes Valdivia and Unión Temuco to gain experience, in 2009 after being considered by Sergio Markarián he definitively joined The Lions and helped the team to win the Torneo Apertura.

In 2011, he left the club after not being considered by Jorge Sampaoli and joined Primera B (second-tier) side Deportes Copiapó in a long-season deal. Novoa completed the entire season with 2 goals in 16 appearances.

In January 2012, Novoa returned his former club Unión Temuco (owned by Universidad de Chile legend Marcelo Salas) and he stayed here even after the club's merger with Deportes Temuco. In December 2013, he finished his contract.

Honours

Club
Universidad de Chile
 Primera División de Chile (1): 2009 Apertura

References

External links
 

1986 births
Living people
Chilean footballers
Chilean Primera División players
Primera B de Chile players
Unión Temuco footballers
Universidad de Chile footballers
Deportes Temuco footballers
Association football defenders
Deportes Valdivia footballers
Deportes Copiapó footballers